Goodnight, Sweetheart is a 1944 American comedy film directed by Joseph Santley and written by Isabel Dawn and Jack Townley. The film stars Robert Livingston, Ruth Terry, Henry Hull, Grant Withers, Thurston Hall and Lloyd Corrigan. The film was released on June 17, 1944, by Republic Pictures.

Plot
Goodnight, Sweetheart is a comedy that includes a couple's offbeat romance. Mainly, a reporter takes on the mayoral race of a candidate that has been endorsed by a rival newspaper.

Cast  
Robert Livingston as Johnny Newsome
Ruth Terry as Caryl Martin
Henry Hull as Jeff Parker
Grant Withers as Matt Colby
Thurston Hall as Judge James Rutherford
Lloyd Corrigan as Police Chief Davis
Maude Eburne as Johnny's Landlady
Ellen Lowe as Caryl's Landlady
Olin Howland as Slim Taylor 
Lucien Littlefield as Collins
Chester Conklin as Bottle Man
Emmett Lynn as Pete
William "Billy" Benedict as Bellboy

References

External links 
 

1944 films
1940s English-language films
American comedy films
1944 comedy films
Republic Pictures films
Films directed by Joseph Santley
American black-and-white films
1940s American films